Ludwig Otto Hölder (December 22, 1859 – August 29, 1937) was a German mathematician born in Stuttgart.

Early life and education
Hölder was the youngest of three sons of professor Otto Hölder (1811–1890), and a grandson of professor Christian Gottlieb Hölder (1776–1847); his two brothers also became professors. He first studied at the Polytechnikum (which today is the University of Stuttgart) and then in 1877 went to Berlin where he was a student of Leopold Kronecker, Karl Weierstrass, and Ernst Kummer.

In 1877, he entered the University of Berlin and took his doctorate from the University of Tübingen in 1882. The title of his doctoral thesis was "Beiträge zur Potentialtheorie" ("Contributions to potential theory"). Following this, he went to the University of Leipzig but was unable to habilitate there, instead earning a second doctorate and habilitation at the University of Göttingen, both in 1884.

Academic career and later life
He was unable to get government approval for a faculty position in Göttingen, and instead was offered a position as extraordinary professor at Tübingen in 1889. Temporary mental incapacitation delayed his acceptance but he began working there in 1890. In 1899, he took the former chair of Sophus Lie as a full professor at the University of Leipzig. There he served as dean from 1912 to 1913, and as rector in 1918.

He married Helene, the daughter of a bank director and politician, in 1899. They had two sons and two daughters. His son Ernst Hölder became another mathematician, and his daughter Irmgard married mathematician Aurel Wintner.

In 1933, Hölder signed the Vow of allegiance of the Professors of the German Universities and High-Schools to Adolf Hitler and the National Socialistic State.

Mathematical contributions
Holder's inequality, named for Hölder, was actually proven earlier by Leonard James Rogers. It is named for a paper in which Hölder, citing Rogers, reproves it; in turn, the same paper includes a proof of what is now called Jensen's inequality, with some side conditions that were later removed by Jensen.
Hölder is also noted for many other theorems including the Jordan–Hölder theorem, the theorem stating that every linearly ordered group that satisfies an Archimedean property is isomorphic to a subgroup of the additive group of real numbers, the classification of simple groups of order up to 200, the anomalous outer automorphisms of the symmetric group S6, and Hölder's theorem, which implies that the Gamma function satisfies no algebraic differential equation. Another idea related to his name is the Hölder condition (or Hölder continuity), which is used in many areas of analysis, including the theories of partial differential equations and function spaces.

References 

Group theorists
19th-century German mathematicians
20th-century German mathematicians
1859 births
1937 deaths
Scientists from Stuttgart
Humboldt University of Berlin alumni
University of Tübingen alumni
Academic staff of Leipzig University
University of Stuttgart alumni
Academic staff of the University of Tübingen
Academic staff of the University of Göttingen